16 Virginis is a single star in the zodiac constellation of Virgo, located about 308 light years from the Sun. It has the Bayer designation c Virginis; 16 Virginis is the Flamsteed designation. This object is visible to the naked eye as a faint, orange-hued star with an apparent visual magnitude of 4.96. This is an IAU radial velocity standard star; it is moving further from the Earth with a heliocentric radial velocity of +37 km/s.

In Chinese astronomy, 16 Virginis is called 謁者, Pinyin: Yèzhě, meaning Usher to the Court, because this star is marking itself and stand alone in Usher to the Court asterism, Supreme Palace enclosure mansion (see : Chinese constellation).

It is a red clump giant, which indicates is on the horizontal branch generating energy via helium fusion at its core. It is about three billion years old with 1.62 times the mass of the Sun and is radiating 132 times the Sun's luminosity from its enlarged photosphere at an effective temperature of 4,423 K.

References 

K-type giants
Horizontal-branch stars
Suspected variables
Virgo (constellation)
Virginis, c
Durchmusterung objects
Virginis, 016
107328
060172
4695